In the United States, an organ procurement organization (OPO) is a non-profit organization that is responsible for the evaluation and procurement of deceased-donor organs for organ transplantation.  There are 57 such organizations in the United States, each responsible for organ procurement in a specific region, and each a member of the Organ Procurement and Transplantation Network (OPTN), a federally-mandated network managed by the United Network for Organ Sharing (UNOS) under federal contract.  The individual OPOs represent the front line of organ procurement, having direct contact with the donor's hospital and the family of the recently deceased donor.  Once the OPO receives authorization for donation from the decedent's family or through first-person authorization (such as a state or national Donor Registry), it works with UNOS to identify the best candidates for the available organs, and coordinates with the surgical team for each organ recipient.

OPOs are also charged with educating the public to increase awareness of and participation in the organ donation process.


List of organ procurement organizations 
All organ procurement organizations in the United States are members, by law, of the Organ Procurement and Transplantation Network (administered by the United Network for Organ Sharing, and most are also members of the Association of Organ Procurement Organizations (AOPO). Many of the OPOs are also members of Donate Life America. Some OPOs are affiliated with hospitals and are not considered independent.

References

Organ transplantation